The Maglie–Gagliano del Capo railway is a  long railway line that connects Lecce with Zollino, Maglie and Gagliano del Capo in the region of Apulia, Italy.

History

The line was opened in 1910.

Usage
The line is used by the following service(s):

Local services (Treno regionale) Zollino - Maglie - Tricase - Gagliano

See also 
 List of railway lines in Italy

References

This article is based upon a translation of the Italian language version as at February 2015.

External links 

Railway lines in Apulia
Railway lines opened in 1910
Maglie